Neusticurus medemi, also known commonly as Medem's neusticurus, is a species of lizard in the family Gymnophthalmidae. The species is native to northern South America.

Etymology
The specific name, medemi, is in honor of Colombian herpetologist Federico Medem.

Geographic range
N. medemi is found in Colombia (Vaupés Department) and Venezuela.

Habitat
The preferred natural habitats of N. medemi are freshwater wetlands and forest, at altitudes of

Reproduction
N. medemi is oviparous.

References

Further reading
Dixon JR, Lamar WW (1981). "A New Species of Microteiid Lizard (Genus Neusticurus) from Colombia". Journal of Herpetology 15 (3): 309–314. (Neusticurus medemi, new species).
Rivas GA, César R. Molina CR, Ugueto GN, Barros TR, Barrio-Amorós CL, Kok PJR (2012). "Reptiles of Venezuela: an updated and commented checklist" Zootaxa 3211: 1–64.

Neusticurus
Reptiles of Colombia
Reptiles of Venezuela
Reptiles described in 1981
Taxa named by James R. Dixon
Taxa named by William W. Lamar